Mario Hernán Videla (born 28 January 1962 in Mendoza) is a former Argentine footballer. He played for Argentinos Juniors during their golden era in the 1980s, he also won two league championships with Millonarios in Colombia.

Videla started his professional career with Gimnasia y Esgrima de Mendoza in the early 1980s. In 1982, he joined Argentinos Juniors shortly after the sale of Diego Maradona to Boca Juniors. During his time at the club, Argentinos enjoyed some remarkable successes, they won back to back league championships in the Metropolitano 1984 and the Nacional 1985. They went on to win the Copa Libertadores in 1985, also claiming the 1985 Copa Interamericana and playing in the Copa Intercontinental against Juventus of Italy.

In 1987 Videla joined Millonarios in Colombia where he won back to back league titles with the club in 1987 and 1988.

Videla returned to Argentina where he had short spells with Racing Club, Newell's Old Boys and San Lorenzo de Almagro.

In 1991, Videla played for the Hamilton Steelers in Canada. He then spent some time with  FBC Melgar in Peru before returning to Argentina where he played out his career at Deportivo Laferrere in the Second division.

Titles

References

1962 births
Living people
Sportspeople from Mendoza, Argentina
Argentine footballers
Argentine people of Spanish descent
Association football midfielders
Argentinos Juniors footballers
Millonarios F.C. players
Racing Club de Avellaneda footballers
Newell's Old Boys footballers
San Lorenzo de Almagro footballers
FBC Melgar footballers
Argentine Primera División players
Argentine expatriate footballers
Expatriate footballers in Colombia
Hamilton Steelers (1981–1992) players